Sergio Gontán Gallardo (born 27 December 1991), known as Keko, is a Spanish professional footballer who plays for USL Championship club Sacramento Republic as a right winger.

Formed at Atlético Madrid, he made 112 La Liga appearance for that club, Valladolid, Eibar and Málaga. He also played in Serie A for Catania.

Club career

Atlético Madrid
Keko was born in Brunete, Community of Madrid. A product of local Atlético Madrid's youth ranks, he made his first-team – and La Liga – debut on 12 September 2009, taking the field as a 63rd-minute substitute for Florent Sinama Pongolle in a 1–1 home draw against Racing de Santander, aged just 17. Speaking to Diario AS after the match, he said: "The truth is that I have always dreamed of playing in this stadium, despite the draw, it was a dream come true. I did not think about the protests outside the ground, and I only wanted to score. I hope to have more chances, but I have to be calm and see what the coach decides."

Late in January 2010, Keko was loaned to Real Valladolid in the same league until the end of the season. He made his debut for his new team against Valencia CF, appearing as a late replacement in an eventual 2–0 away loss on 6 February.

Keko split the 2010–11 campaign with two Segunda División sides, FC Cartagena and Girona FC, totalling 25 matches (nine starts, 952 minutes) as both managed to retain their league status.

Catania
On 19 July 2011, after he failed to renew his contract with Atlético Madrid, Keko completed a transfer to Calcio Catania in Italy, signing a three-year deal and being awarded the No. 15 jersey at the Sicilian club. On 7 January 2012, however, along with teammate Fabio Sciacca, he joined Serie B's U.S. Grosseto F.C. on loan.

Keko scored on his Serie A debut on 24 February 2013, starting and contributing to a 2–1 away win over Parma FC. In May 2014, he was released; valued at €10 million by Catania, he remained unemployed for nearly four months and hired a personal trainer while contemplating leaving football.

Albacete
On 28 August 2014, Keko signed a 1+1 contract with Albacete Balompié, recently promoted to the second tier. He totalled more than 2,500 minutes of action during his only season, notably scoring a brace in a 3–2 victory at UE Llagostera on 21 May 2015 that confirmed the side's survival.

Eibar
On 9 July 2015, Keko moved to SD Eibar in the top division after agreeing to a two-year contract. He scored his first goal in the competition on 30 December, opening the 2–0 home win against Sporting de Gijón.

Málaga

On 21 June 2016, Keko joined Málaga CF on a four-year deal. He appeared in 22 scoreless matches in his first season, helping his team to finish in 11th position.

After suffering relegation, Keko agreed to a one-year loan back at former club Valladolid on 29 July 2018, now in the top flight. On 31 January 2020, he terminated his contract with the Andalusians.

Deportivo
On 31 January 2020, just hours after leaving Málaga, Keko signed a two-and-a-half-year deal with Deportivo de La Coruña, still in division two. After relegation, he extended it until 2024. 

Keko left the Estadio Riazor in August 2021.

Sacramento Republic
On 11 January 2022, Keko joined Sacramento Republic FC of the USL Championship for the upcoming season. He made his debut for the Californians on 12 March as a late substitute in a 3–1 home defeat of El Paso Locomotive FC, concluding the scoring. 

Keko played in the final of the U.S. Open Cup on 7 September, which his team lost 3–0 to Major League Soccer club Orlando City SC, as the third lower-league team to contest the fixture since MLS began in 1996.

International career
Keko participated in the 2008 UEFA European Under-17 Championship with Spain, helping his country to eventual victory in the tournament and scoring in the final, a 4–0 win over France.

Career statistics

Club

Honours
Spain
UEFA European Under-17 Championship: 2008

References

External links

1991 births
Living people
Spanish footballers
Footballers from the Community of Madrid
Association football wingers
La Liga players
Segunda División players
Segunda División B players
Atlético Madrid B players
Atlético Madrid footballers
Real Valladolid players
FC Cartagena footballers
Girona FC players
Albacete Balompié players
SD Eibar footballers
Málaga CF players
Deportivo de La Coruña players
Serie A players
Serie B players
Catania S.S.D. players
F.C. Grosseto S.S.D. players
USL Championship players
Sacramento Republic FC players
Spain youth international footballers
Spanish expatriate footballers
Expatriate footballers in Italy
Expatriate soccer players in the United States
Spanish expatriate sportspeople in Italy
Spanish expatriate sportspeople in the United States